1983 is a 2014 Indian Malayalam-language coming-of-age sports film directed by fashion photographer Abrid Shine, who wrote the story and co-wrote the script with Bipin Chandran. The film, produced under the banner of Shams Films, stars Nivin Pauly in the lead role. Anoop Menon, Nikki Galrani, Joy Mathew, Srinda Arhaan, Jacob Gregory, Saiju Kurup, Shine Tom Chacko, Dinesh, Sui Joseph, Neeraj Madhav and Sanju, make up the rest of the cast. Pradeesh Varma cranked the camera and the music director was Gopi Sunder, for which he received the 62nd National Film Awards for Best Background Score.

The film is a family drama that revolves around cricket. It centers on Rameshan (Nivin Pauly) and his memories from 1983 when India won its first World Cup under Kapil Dev. 1983, which is also a tribute to cricketer Sachin Tendulkar, was released on 31 January and was the first success film of 2014. All the songs composed by Gopi Sunder became popular and one of them, "Olanjali Kuruvi", was a chartbuster.

The film received three Kerala State Film Awards including Best Debut Director for Abride Shine, Best Actor for Nivin Pauly and Second Best Actor for Anoop Menon. It is widely regarded as one of the best movies  during the Malayalam New Wave.

Plot
In a remote village in Kerala named Brahmamangalam, the people have a passion for cricket. From India winning their first Cricket World Cup in 1983, to present times, the story follows the father-son relationship of two generations. As a teenager Rameshan is passionate about cricket and performs well in his academics. His father wants his son to become an engineer one day. Rameshan is in love with Manjula, who is studying in the same school. He is part of a local cricket team, formed by his close friends, and wins many local tournaments with his above par performance in batting. However, with time his academic results turn very poor and he even fails his 12th Board exams. Even if he fails in his academics, his love for the game remains the same and his father continues to protest against this. His love interest, Manjula, is very good at her studies and joins another college for higher education.

Rameshan joins his father in running an electrical workshop and lives a modest life. His love for game continues all this while. Eventually, he loses his lover who marries an Indian-American. A depressed Rameshan is encouraged by his friends and family to marry a girl from the same village. His wife, Susheela, is ignorant about cricket to such an extent that she doesn't know Sachin Tendulkar. Rameshan is blessed with his son, Kannan, who shows an interest in cricket at a very young age. Rameshan still plays cricket and starts coaching his son. Rameshan wants his son to become a cricketer.  He takes his son to a former state cricket player Vijay Menon's sports academy. Rameshan faces many financial problems to support his son's coaching. His wife helps him against his mother's wishes. After some days unfortunately Vijay wants to go to Chennai, as he was called by his senior coach Chandrakant and he wants Vijay to be with him to take responsibility of his cricket coaching club. For a better future for Kannan, Vijay advises Rameshan to join the cricket academy of his friend. But Kannan could get the selection in order to join the academy. But he fails to get the selection as the ball strikes on the back tail and he gets injured.

Rameshan's father and son play a vital role in his life and eventually his father gives him his support to pursue his love for cricket. At the end, Rameshan, with the help of his father, makes a bowling machine to help his son play pace. After many ups and downs, Kannan gets selected for the Under-14 district team. Like how he loved the cricket now his son also loves cricket. The movie ends with Rameshan talking about wanting to see his son wearing India's jersey.

Cast

 Nivin Pauly as Rameshan
 Anoop Menon as Vijay Menon, cricket coach
 Bhagath Abrid as Kannan, Son of Rameshan
 Srinda Arhaan as Susheela, wife of Rameshan
 Nikki Galrani as Manjula Sasidharan, ex-lover of Rameshan
 Joy Mathew as Gopi Aashaan, father of Rameshan
 Seema G. Nair as Mother of Rameshan
 Saiju Kurup as Pappan
 Dinesh Prabhakar as Ambrose Saji
 Sanju Sivram as Babukuttan
 Neeraj Madhav as Prahaladan a.k.a. Vilakkoothi
 Kalabhavan Prajod as Mantle Jerry
 Jacob Gregory as Sachin (extended cameo)
 Joju George as David, cricket coach
 Nandhana Varma as Young Manjula Sasidharan
 Ambika Mohan as Manjula's Mother (cameo appearance)
 Arun as Manjula's Husband (cameo appearance)
 Valsala Menon
 Gokulan as Kuttan 
 Sajan Palluruthy as commentator
 Jiya Irani as Minnal Freddy
 Priyanka as Beautician (cameo appearance)
 Chembil Ashokan as Tea Shop Owner (cameo appearance)

Production
The film started its shoot in May 2013 in Ernakulam, produced by Shamsudheen under the banner of Shams films. The movie distribution was done by LJ Films, owned by director Lal Jose.

Soundtrack

Reception
Entertainment site oneindia gave the film 3.5/5 stars and said "1983 is a thoroughly enjoyable entertainer which pleases your heart throughout. For almost all generations, it's a nostalgic revisit to those childhood memories, where you had played cricket with your friends, a tennis ball, wickets of stick, and a bat carved from leaf stalk".

IBTimes ranked Abrid Shine first in its list of the top 5 debutant Malayalam directors of 2014.

Box office 
It was one of the biggest commercial successes of 2014 in Malayalam.

Awards and nominations

Notes

References

External links
 

Films about cricket in India
2014 directorial debut films
2010s Malayalam-language films
Films scored by Gopi Sundar
1983 Cricket World Cup
Films directed by Abrid Shine